Kailasanathar Temple is the name of several famous megalith rock cut kovils dedicated to the deity Shiva in the form Kailasanathar, whose primary abode is Mount Kailash from which the temples take their names and inspiration.

Kailasanathar Temple may refer to:
 Kanchi Kailasanathar Temple, Pallava rock-cut Shiva temple in Kanchipuram, Tamil Nadu
 Kailasa temple, Ellora, Rastrakuta-Pallava rock cut black granite megalithic Shiva temple of the Ellora Caves, near Aurangabad in Maharashtra
 Kailasanathar Temple, Uthiramerur, Pallava rock-cut Shiva temple in Uthiramerur, Kanchipuram district, Tamil Nadu
 Kailasanathar Temple, Thingalur, a Chola temple and a Paadal Petra Sthalam in Thingalur
 Kailasanathar temple, Srivaikuntam, a temple in Srivaikuntam

See also
Koneswaram temple, Chola-Pallava-Pandya rock cut black granite megalithic Shiva temple of Trincomalee, also known from medieval period as Thirukonamalai Konesar Kovil and Dakshina Kailasam
Kailasanathar temple karaikal,built by chola-pandya-pallava and renovated during  British and French rule